Coronavirus Australia was an app released by the Australian Government designed to allow users to access information about the COVID-19 pandemic in Australia. The app was released by the Department of Health on 29 March 2020, and decommissioned two years later on 31 August 2022. Over its lifetime, the app was downloaded over a million times and was initially ranked first in the Apple App Store's "Health and Fitness" category. Due to the short development period of two weeks, the app initially served primarily as an aggregate of links to official government websites. Shortly after an update was released adding a voluntary "isolation registration" form that collected the location, name, age, mobile phone number, isolation start date, and various other details about users who were self isolating.

On 14 April 2020 a separate contact tracing app, COVIDSafe, was announced based on Singapore's TraceTogether app and BlueTrace protocol.


Development 

The app was developed by recruitment house Delv Pty Ltd over a period of two weeks. The app launched on 29 March 2020, three days after it was first announced publicly. Although initially rumoured to have similar functions to Singapore's open-source TraceTogether app, it did not have such features at release. The day after launch an update was released adding a voluntary isolation registration form, and a web version was released to accompany it.

Later, on 9 April 2020, another update was released adding an "essential information" tab and link to various translations of SBS news. The essential information tab added dot points summarising information about the coronavirus.

The 28 May 2020 release completely overhauled the user interface, moving from a card based interface with a navigation drawer, to a tab and folder based one. With the replacement of the drawer with tabs on Android, the two apps gained a consistent navigation model. A news feed showing the latest news items has been moved to the home screen, with many of the cards that were previously present there moved to the tab bar or nested within a folder. Additionally, a custom content management system has been introduced, allowing for the embedding of native articles and content.
The release on 9 July 2020 introduced a COVID-19 clinic finder and restriction checker. The clinic finder was built on top of the Australian Government's existing HealthDirect API, in contrast to the rest of the app which uses Firebase Firestore and Remote Config to fetch dynamic content.

On 30 September 2020, the contract for the development of the Coronavirus Australia app concluded, effectively ending major development of the app.

References

External links 
 Google Play link
 App Store link

Government software
E-government in Australia
2020 establishments in Australia
COVID-19 pandemic in Australia
Software associated with the COVID-19 pandemic
2020 software
Android (operating system) software
IOS software